Victoria "Vicki" Huntington is a Canadian politician who served in the Legislative Assembly of British Columbia from 2009 until 2017 as an independent for Delta South.

Education and early career

Huntington is a native of Vancouver, British Columbia, and has a degree in political science from the University of British Columbia. Much of her early career was spent in the RCMP Security Service and subsequently working with ministers of the crown in Ottawa, Ontario. More recently, she served five terms as an elected Councillor in the municipality of Delta, British Columbia.

Huntington worked with the RCMP Security Service for most of the 1970s. Prior to joining the force she was commissioned a first lieutenant in the Canadian Army Intelligence Corps (Res).

Following her years with the Security Service, Huntington served as band manager for the Gitanmaax Indian Reserve in Hazelton. She later worked as a policy assistant to the federal Minister of Indian Affairs and Northern Development, as a member of the Nisga’a Task Group, and as vice chair of the Lower Mainland Treaty Advisory Committee (LMTAC) and its representative on the Provincial Treaty Negotiating Team.

During her years in Ottawa, Huntington also served as executive assistant and acting chief of staff to the Solicitor General of Canada and to the Minister of National Revenue. She was also involved in various capacities with the Progressive Conservative Party of Canada. She returned to British Columbia in 1988 as the director of the Federal Ministers’ Regional Offices at Canada Place in Vancouver.

Huntington received an award from the Delta Farmland and Wildlife Trust for exceptional service.

Political career
A resident of Ladner (Delta), British Columbia, Huntington was first elected in 1993 to Delta Municipal Council and returned to council at or near the top of the polls in the four subsequent municipal elections. She declined to run again in 2008.

Huntington ran in the 2009 general election. She finished a close second in initial results on election night, with opponent Wally Oppal leading by a margin of just two votes over Huntington. This result was subject to an automatic judicial recount because the margin of victory was fewer than one-500th of all votes cast. On May 26, 2009, the recount revealed that Huntington had defeated Oppal by 32 votes, to become the first independent MLA elected to the B.C. provincial legislature since the general election of 1949.

Huntington was elected to a second term in the 2013 election with an increased plurality. She was the first independent MLA in the province's history to be re-elected to a second term.

Huntington had stated in May 2016, that she was "not ready to retire", but later changed her mind in January 2017 citing health concerns and decided not to seek a third term.

Post-Political career
Huntington endorsed Green Party candidate Peter van der Velden for Delta South in the 2020 election.

Electoral record

Family

Huntington's father Ron Huntington was elected to the House of Commons of Canada three times as a Progressive Conservative, in 1974, 1979, and 1980, representing the electoral district of Capilano on metro Vancouver's north shore. In 1979, he served as minister of state for small business in the government of Joe Clark.

References

External links
Legislative Assembly web site
Personal web site

Independent MLAs in British Columbia
Living people
People from Delta, British Columbia
Politicians from Vancouver
University of British Columbia alumni
Women MLAs in British Columbia
21st-century Canadian politicians
21st-century Canadian women politicians
British Columbia municipal councillors
Year of birth missing (living people)